Carabus elysii pulcher is a subspecies of ground beetle in the subfamily Carabinae that is endemic to Henan, China. The subspecies are black coloured with bronze pronotum.

References

elysii pulcher
Beetles described in 1997
Beetles of Asia
Endemic fauna of Henan